The A44 motorway is a motorway in the Netherlands connecting the A4 with Wassenaar. The route continues as main road N44 towards The Hague, providing an alternative link with Amsterdam for the A4 motorway. The A44 also serves Leiden and the Bollenstreek.

Overview
Near Leimuiden, the A44 motorway splits from the A4 at Burgerveen interchange. Until the 1960s, the A4 followed the route of the current A44 passing Leiden west. Then the new A4 was built east of the city creating a more direct route from Amsterdam to Rotterdam. The former A4 was eventually renumbered into A44. Both motorways are important arteries for The Hague, where the A44 is primarily focused on the city center. The A44 is one of the oldest motorways of the country with parts dating from the 1930s. Small dimensions of the carriageway, narrow bridges and tight junctions are signs of outdated design. It is also remarkable that the A44 is one of the very few busy Randstad-motorways not being equipped with active traffic management nor lit for the major part.

When leaving the Burgerveen interchange in the province of North Holland, the A44 runs through rural area known as the Bollenstreek. In Spring the fields fill up with coloured flowers. A few towns pass by and the motorway crosses the Ringvaart where it enters the province of South Holland. The surroundings of the A44 become more populated when approaching Leiden. The motorway ends a few kilometers south of Leiden in Wassenaar at an at-grade junction with traffic lights. The route continues as major road N44, running through the wooded estates of Wassenaar towards The Hague. The N44 ends at  the city limits of The Hague. Here, the route continues as city route s101 towards the city centre. A split-level interchange connects the N44 with the N14 (Ring Den Haag) towards Leidschendam and the S200 (Ring Den Haag) towards Scheveningen.

Exit list

External links

References 

Motorways in the Netherlands
Motorways in North Holland
Motorways in South Holland